This article refers to the situation of malnutrition in the Indian state of Kerala.

According to the India State Hunger Index published by the International Food Policy Research Institute, the severity of hunger and malnutrition in Kerala is the lowest in India.

Statistics
According to the India State Hunger Index:
 9% of children in Kerala are underweight.
 5.6% of the total population are undernourished
 Infant mortality rate in Kerala is 0.6%: this figure is the lowest among Indian states

See also
Malnutrition in India

References

Malnutrition in India
Kerala society
Economy of Kerala
Health in Kerala